Anna Berger may refer to:

 Anna Berger (actress) (1922–2014), American actress
 Anna Maria Busse Berger, American academic and educator